The 175th Ohio Infantry Regiment, sometimes 175th Ohio Volunteer Infantry (or 175th OVI) was an infantry regiment in the Union Army during the American Civil War.

Service
The 175th Ohio Infantry was organized at Camp Dennison near Cincinnati, Ohio, and mustered in for one year service on October 11, 1864, under the command of Colonel Daniel W. McCoy.  Companies I and K were mustered in at Camp Chase in Columbus, Ohio.

The regiment was attached to 3rd Brigade, 3rd Division, XXIII Corps, Army of the Ohio, to December 1864. Post of Columbia, Tennessee, Department of the Cumberland, to March 1865. 2nd Sub-District, District of Middle Tennessee, to June 1865.

The 175th Ohio Infantry mustered out of service June 27, 1865, at Nashville, Tennessee.

Detailed service
Left Ohio for Nashville, Tennessee, October 11; then moved to Columbia, Tennessee, October 20, and assigned to post and garrison duty there, also guarding Tennessee & Alabama Railroad until November 24. Nashville Campaign November 24-December 28. Columbia, Duck River, November 24–27. Battle of Franklin November 30. Occupation of Nashville during Hood's investment December 1–15. Battle of Nashville December 15–16. Occupation of Fort Negley until December 25. Ordered to Columbia, Tenn., December 25, and garrison duty there until June 1865. Moved to Nashville, Tenn., June 23.

Casualties
The regiment lost a total of 124 men during service; 1 officer and 15 enlisted men killed or mortally wounded, 2 officers and 106 enlisted men due to disease.

Commanders
 Colonel Daniel W. McCoy

See also

 List of Ohio Civil War units
 Ohio in the Civil War

References
 Dyer, Frederick H. A Compendium of the War of the Rebellion (Des Moines, IA:  Dyer Pub. Co.), 1908.
 Ohio Roster Commission. Official Roster of the Soldiers of the State of Ohio in the War on the Rebellion, 1861–1865, Compiled Under the Direction of the Roster Commission (Akron, OH: Werner Co.), 1886–1895.
 Osburn, Richard B. 24th and 175th Regiments of Volunteer Infantry from Ohio, 1861-1865 (Brunswick, GA:  R. B. Osburn), 2005. [revised, 2007]
 Reid, Whitelaw. Ohio in the War: Her Statesmen, Her Generals, and Soldiers (Cincinnati, OH: Moore, Wilstach, & Baldwin), 1868. 
Attribution

External links
 Ohio in the Civil War: 175th Ohio Volunteer Infantry by Larry Stevens
 National flag of the 175th Ohio Infantry
 Regimental flag of the 175th Ohio Infantry
 Joseph Garner 175th Ohio Infantry

Military units and formations established in 1864
Military units and formations disestablished in 1865
Units and formations of the Union Army from Ohio
1864 establishments in Ohio